True Believer (also released as Fighting Justice) is a 1989 American courtroom drama written by Wesley Strick, directed by Joseph Ruben, and starring James Woods, Robert Downey Jr., Yuji Okumoto, Margaret Colin, and Kurtwood Smith.

The film is loosely based on an investigative series of articles written by Pulitzer Prize-nominated journalist K. W. Lee on the wrongful conviction of immigrant Chol Soo Lee for a 1973 San Francisco Chinatown gangland murder. The news coverage led to a new trial, eventual acquittal and release of the prisoner from San Quentin's Death Row. Screenwriter Wesley Strick based the character of Eddie Dodd on real-life Bay Area defense attorney Tony Serra.

Plot summary
Eddie Dodd is a burnt-out attorney who has left behind civil rights work to defend drug dealers. Roger Baron is an idealistic young legal clerk, fresh out of law school, who encourages Dodd to take on the case of Shu Kai Kim, a young Korean man who was imprisoned for a gang-related murder committed in New York's Chinatown and has now killed a fellow inmate in self-defense. Kim's mother believes her son was wrongfully accused in the gang-related murder. Dodd and Baron's investigation leads to a conspiracy among the district attorney, a police informant, and several police officers.

Cast

 James Woods as Eddie Dodd
 Robert Downey Jr. as Roger Baron
 Yuji Okumoto as Shu Kai Kim
 Margaret Colin as Kitty Greer
 Kurtwood Smith as Robert Reynard
 Tom Bower as Cecil Skell
 Gerry Bamman as Brian Nevins
 Charles Hallahan as Vincent Dennehy
 Miguel Fernandes (See Miguel Fernandes on IMDb) as Art Esparza
 Sully Diaz as Maraquilla Esparza
 Luis Guzman as Ortega
 Joel Polis as Dean Rabin
 Kurt Fuller as George Ballistics
 Graham Beckel as Sklaroff
 John Snyder as Chuckie Loeder

Reception
Strick's screenplay was nominated for a 1990 Edgar Award for Best Mystery Motion Picture. Film critic Roger Ebert commended Woods's performance for being "hypnotically watchable."

At the time of True Believers release, K. W. Lee told the Charleston Gazette he enjoyed the film "as fiction...but it was not a true picture. They have completely preempted the struggle of Asians."

True Believer inspired a spin-off television series, Eddie Dodd, starring Treat Williams in the title role.

The film holds a rating of 96% on Rotten Tomatoes from 23 reviews.

Home media
The film was released on Blu-ray in the United States by Mill Creek Entertainment on August 13, 2019.

References

External links
 
 
 

1989 films
1989 crime drama films
1980s legal films
American crime drama films
American legal films
Films directed by Joseph Ruben
American courtroom films
Films about race and ethnicity
Films shot in New York City
1980s prison films
Columbia Pictures films
Films scored by Brad Fiedel
Asian-American drama films
Films about Korean Americans
Chinatown, Manhattan
Films produced by Walter F. Parkes
Films set in San Quentin State Prison
1980s English-language films
1980s American films